The 28th annual Venice International Film Festival was held from 26 August to 8 September 1967.

Jury
 Alberto Moravia (Italy) (head of jury)
 Carlos Fuentes (Mexico)  
 Juan Goytisolo (Spain)    
 Erwin Leiser (West Germany)
 Violette Morin (France) 
 Susan Sontag (USA)
 Rostislav Yurenev (Soviet Union)

Films in competition

Awards
Golden Lion:
Belle de Jour (Luis Buñuel)
Special Jury Prize:
La Chinoise (Jean-Luc Godard)
China is Near (Marco Bellocchio)
Volpi Cup:
 Best Actor - Ljubiša Samardžić (Jutro)
 Best Actress - Shirley Knight  (Dutchman)
Best First Work
Lust for Love (Edgar Reitz)
Best Short Film
From One to Eight (Hristo Kovachev)
FIPRESCI Prize
China is Near (Marco Bellocchio)
Samurai Rebellion (Masaki Kobayashi)
OCIC Award
O Salto (Christian de Chalonge)
Pasinetti Award
Belle de Jour (Luis Buñuel)
Parallel Sections - Mouchette (Robert Bresson)
Golden Rudder
Il padre di famiglia (Nanni Loy)

References

External links
 
 Venice Film Festival 1967 Awards on IMDb

Venice International Film Festival
Venice International Film Festival
Venice Film Festival
Film
Venice International Film Festival
Venice International Film Festival